Never is a rural locality (a selo) in Neversky Selsoviet of Skovorodinsky District, Amur Oblast, Russia. The population was 1,400 as of 2018. There are 34 streets.

Geography 
Never is located on the Bolshoy Never River, 16 km east of Skovorodino (the district's administrative centre) by road. Bolshoy Never is the nearest rural locality.

References 

Rural localities in Skovorodinsky District